= Stein Gulch =

Valley in the U.S. state of Oregon

Coordinates: 42°33′35″N 123°07′17″W

Stein Gulch is a valley in the U.S. state of Oregon.

Stein Gulch was named in 1896 after one Julius Stein.
